The 2017 FSP Gold River Women's Challenger was a professional tennis tournament played on outdoor hard courts. It was the seventh edition of the tournament and was part of the 2017 ITF Women's Circuit. It took place in Sacramento, United States, on 24–30 July 2017.

Singles main draw entrants

Seeds 

 1 Rankings as of 17 July 2017.

Other entrants 
The following players received a wildcard into the singles main draw:
  Robin Anderson
  Emina Bektas
  Jillian Taggart
  Anna Tatishvili

The following player received entry by a protected ranking:
  Kimiko Date

The following player received entry by a special exempt:
  Ashley Kratzer

The following players received entry from the qualifying draw:
  Victoria Duval
  Ena Shibahara
  Chanel Simmonds
  Xu Shilin

Champions

Singles

 Amanda Anisimova def.  Ajla Tomljanović, walkover

Doubles
 
 Desirae Krawczyk /  Giuliana Olmos def.  Jovana Jakšić /  Vera Lapko, 6–1, 6–2

External links 
 2017 FSP Gold River Women's Challenger at ITFtennis.com
 Official website

2017 ITF Women's Circuit
2017 in American tennis
2017 in sports in California
July 2017 sports events in the United States
FSP Gold River Women's Challenger